Uruguay is a country in South America

Uruguay may also refer to:
 Uruguay Department, an administrative subdivision of Entre Ríos Province, Argentina
 Uruguay Island, an island of the Wilhelm Archipelago, Antarctica
 Uruguay River, a river bordering Argentina, Brazil and Uruguay
 ARA Uruguay, a museum ship in Buenos Aires, Argentina
 Uruguay (Buenos Aires Metro), a metro station
 Uruguay (Milan Metro), a metro station

See also
 Concepción del Uruguay, a city in Entre Ríos, Argentina
 Corbeta Uruguay, a former Argentine military outpost in the South Sandwich Islands